Dozdak-e Olya (also Romanized as Dozdak-e ‘Olyā; also known as Dozdak-e Bālā) is a village in Rostam-e Do Rural District, in the Central District of Rostam County, Fars Province, Iran. At the 2006 census, its population was 246, in 54 families.

References 

Populated places in Rostam County